Poom is an Estonian surname. 'Poom'  as 'beam' or a loud, deep, resonant sound ('boom') in English.
Notable people with the surname include:

Markus Poom (born 1999), Estonian footballer 
Mart Poom (born 1972), Estonian footballer and coach
Paul Poom (born 1958), Estonian actor

References

Estonian-language surnames